Spellbreaker: Secret of the Leprechauns is a 1996 American direct-to-video film, starring Gregory Smith, Madeleine Potter, Godfrey James, John Bluthal and Tina Martin. It was co-written and directed by Ted Nicolaou. The film is a sequel to Leapin’ Leprechauns! and both movies were filmed back-to-back in Romania.

Plot
In this sequel, Mikey travels on vacation to Ireland intending to spend sometime with his grandpa, Michael. Now, they will live another great adventure in the leprechauns's world.

Cast
 Gregory Smith as Mikey Dennehy
 Madeleine Potter as Morgan / Nula
 Godfrey James as King Kevin
 John Bluthal as Michael Dennehy
 Tina Martin as Maeve, Queen of the Fairies

Reception
Monster Hunter gave the film a bad review, however noting that it is better than its predecessor: "Keeping the action set in Ireland, dispensing with the lame family drama and ramping up the action up to and including a trip to the underworld where poor Mikey is forced into a leather harness so he can haul the steamer trunk full of leprechauns and his now shrunken grandfather(!) easily make Spellbreaker a two-leaf clover film to Leapin’ Leprechauns!‘s one-leaf clover blarney. And if it’s all resolved with a bit of leprechaun wish deus ex machina that seemed made up on the spot, well, that’s just something to be chalked up to the mysterious ways of those tricky Fairy Folk, right?". TV Guide gave Spellbreaker two out of five stars, stating: "even kids may be disappointed by the cheap special effects, with a crude illusion of miniaturization attempted merely by posing "leprechauns" as far away from the camera as possible, with magnified objects in the foreground. On the other hand, ornate costumes and interiors (even a properly spooky, fiery Underworld) are quite impressive, and most likely creditable to the opera and theater craftspeople of Bucharest.

References

External links
 
 
 
 

1996 films
Full Moon Features films
Paramount Pictures direct-to-video films
Films about fairies and sprites
1990s English-language films
Films directed by Ted Nicolaou